Felipe Benítez Reyes (born 1960) is a prolific Spanish writer. He was born in Rota, Cadiz, where he lives to this day.

Biography 
He studied at the University of Cádiz and University of Seville. His literary output spans multiple genres, including poetry, novels, short stories, essays, and opinion pieces.

Reyes' poetry has won, among others, the Premio de la Crítica and the Premio Nacional de Literatura. Both were awarded for his 1995 collection Vidas improbables. Among his novels, notable works include La propiedad del paraíso (1995), Humo (1995, Premio Ateneo de Sevilla), El novio del mundo (1998), El pensamiento de los monstruos (2002) y Mercado de espejismos (winner of the 2007 Premio Nadal). His 2009 collection of short fiction Oficios estelares (Destino, 2009) also won multiple prizes (Premio Mario Vargas Llosa NH, Premio Tiflos and Premio Hucha de Oro).

Reyes' works have been translated into English, Italian, Russian, French, Romanian and Portuguese.

References

Spanish male writers
1960 births
Living people